Lee Soung-Yong (born 16 January 1988) is a South Korean footballer.

Notes

External links
Lee Soung Yong at Goal.com

1988 births
Living people
Footballers from Seoul
Association football midfielders
South Korean footballers
South Korean expatriate footballers
South Korean expatriate sportspeople in Indonesia
Expatriate footballers in Indonesia
Liga 1 (Indonesia) players
PSAP Sigli players
Expatriate footballers in Thailand